The 1906 Wisconsin Badgers football team represented the University of Wisconsin as a member of the Western Conference during the 1906 college football season. Led by first-year head coach Charles P. Hutchins, the Badgers compiled an overall record of 5–0 with a mark of 3–0 in conference play, sharing the Western Conference title with 1906 Michigan Wolverines football team and 1906 Minnesota Golden Gophers football team. The team's captain was Warren A. Gelbach.

Schedule

References

Wisconsin
Wisconsin Badgers football seasons
Big Ten Conference football champion seasons
College football undefeated seasons
Wisconsin Badgers football